Khvajeh Soheyl (also Romanized as Khvājeh Soheyl; also known as Bīd-e Khān, Bīd-e Khvān, Bīd Khān, Bīd Khūn, Bīd Khvān, and Khvājeh Soheyl Bīd Khūn) is a village in Mashiz Rural District, in the Central District of Bardsir County, Kerman Province, Iran. At the 2006 census, its population was 221, in 53 families.

References 

Populated places in Bardsir County